Longford is a neighbourhood that sits just to the north of Howley and Fairfield and the area to the east of the A49, Winwick road. It is served by bus services 20 and 21 which have a combined frequency of every 5 minutes and operate as a circular route between Warrington Town Centre, Longford and Orford. In 2011 the Longford roundabout was removed and a new traffic light controlled crossroads junction took its place.

Politics
There are three councillors. All councillors for this area are representatives of the Labour Party.

Population
Total Population: 8,012 residents
Male:female ratio: 55.5:44.5
Mean age of population: 31 years

Ethnicity breakdown
96% White
2% Mixed
1% Asian
1% Black

Housing and social situation

Housing
Owned 32%  
Mortgage 39.6%  
Shared 0.7%  
Social Rented (Council) 7.2% 
Social Rented (Housing Assoc) 8.4% 
Private Rented 10.2% 
Other 1%  
Rent Free 0.8%

Parks and recreation
The local park is named Poole Park, and is off Winwick road.

Employment and education

Employment
70.1% are employed.
4.4% are unemployed.
2.2% are students.
23.3% are classed as "economically inactive".

Education
25.5% have no qualifications.
38.6% have only level 1 or 2 qualifications.
18.3% have level 3 or higher.

References

Geography of Warrington